Taj Atwal (born in December 1987) is a British actress from Norwich, who has appeared in Stella, In the Club, Line of Duty, TV drama The Syndicate and comedy Hullraisers.

Biography
Atwal was born in Norwich to an Indian family. After her mother lost her job at the Rowntree's factory in Norwich and was offered a job in York, Atwal moved there with her mother when aged about seven. Living in Haxby, Atwal participated in stage productions at Easingwold School. She had to leave her home aged 16, and lived with volunteers from the homeless charity SASH (Safe and Sound Homes) for two years, and attended York College from 2004 to 2007, obtaining distinctions in both a National Award in Dance and a National Diploma qualification in Performing Arts (Acting). For her graduate production, she played Anitra in Peer Gynt. Having gained funding through Dance and Drama Awards, she then became a student at Guildford School of Acting.

In 2013 she played Amani Sarin, a teacher who suffers alopecia due to stress and then lies that she has cancer, in an episode of the anthology series Moving On. Later roles include Jasminder in Stella, Jasmin in In the Club, and PC Tatleen Sohota in the fifth series of Line of Duty (2019). She chose to join the cast of The Syndicate rather than continue in Line of Duty.

Her stage roles include Meenah in East Is East (2014–2015), and Rita in a 2018 production of Rita, Sue and Bob Too. Atwal is an ambassador for Children's Air Ambulance. In 2020 she became a patron of Theatre@41 in York.

Filmography

Film

Television

Theatre

References

Living people
1987 births
21st-century English actresses
Actors from Norwich
British actresses of Indian descent
English stage actresses